Bichi Emirate is a Hausa traditional emirate in Kano State in Northern Nigeria. Its palace is located in the town of Bichi, Bichi Local Government Area.
The Bichi Emirate was established in 2019, when the Kano State Government created four emirates from the oldest kingdom of Kano. The Bichi emirate consists of 9 Local Government Areas of Kano State. These local governments are  Bichi, Bagwai, Shanono, Tsanyawa, Kunchi, Makoda, Dambatta, Dawakin Tofa, and Tofa local governments.

The current emir of Bichi is Nasiru Ado Bayero. Aminu Ado Bayero is the first emir of Bichi emirate since its established in 2019. In 12 March 2020, the Kano State Government replaced him with his brother Nasiru Ado Bayero as the Emir of Bichi following the dethronement of former Emir of Kano Muhammadu Sanusi II from the reign of Emir of Kano with his replacement by Aminu Ado Bayero.

References 

Hausa
History of Nigeria
Non-sovereign monarchy